Jingo is an unincorporated community in Miami County, Kansas, United States.  It is part of the Kansas City metropolitan area.

History
A post office was opened in Jingo in 1885, and remained in operation until it was discontinued in 1902.

References

Further reading

External links
 Miami County maps: Current, Historic, KDOT

Unincorporated communities in Miami County, Kansas
Unincorporated communities in Kansas